Varjak Paw (2003) is a novel by the British author S. F. Said and illustrated by Dave McKean. The illustrations in this book have a dark "gothic" quality. The novel received the 2003 Smarties Gold Award for the 6–8 years range and has been adapted for other media.

Characters 
Varjak Paw, a very young kitten and the main protagonist of the story
Jalal the Paw, A Mesopotamian blue cat who ventured out into the Outside and found a home with the Countessa.
Elder Paw, Varjak's grandfather and one of the few who remembers (part of) The Way of Jalal
Sally Bones, the mysterious white cat who lords over the West Side of the city. She knows "The Way"
Razor, Sally Bones' lieutenant
Ginger, the ruler of the East Side of the city
The Contessa, The old woman who owns the family of Jalal
The Gentleman, a mysterious man who appears one day at the Contessa's house
The Black Cats, two black cats that accompany The Gentleman; perfect fighting machines that are almost invulnerable
Cludge, a dog who Varjak meets and who saves him from the Gentleman
Julius Paw, Varjak's older brother
Father, Son of Elder Paw, Father of Jay, Jerome, Jethro, Julius, and Varjak
Aunt Juni, Mother to Jasmine, Aunt to Jay, Jethro, Jerome, Julius, and Varjak
Mother, Mother of Jay, Jethro, Jerome, Julius, and Varjak
Holly, Varjak's future mate.
Tam, a tabby cat and Holly, and Varjak's best friend 
Varjak Paw's name is an allusion to the film Breakfast at Tiffany's. In the film, one of the main characters, Paul Varjak, has written a book called "Nine Lives". When he and another character look for the book in the library catalog, it is listed as "Nine Lives by Varjak, Paul". S.F. Said is not known to have commented on this connection.

Adaptations

Theatre
In October 2013, Playbox Theatre Company took on Varjak Paw in a major multi-media production.

Opera
In 2010, composer Julian Philips completed an opera on Varjak Paw, to a libretto by Kit Hesketh-Harvey, performed by The Opera Group in September–November.

Film
As of March 2006, Varjak Paw has been optioned by The Jim Henson Company to be developed as an animated family feature film, with Faith Fawusi as director.

References

External links
Official site

2003 British novels
British children's novels
British Gothic novels
Children's novels about animals
2003 children's books
Novels about cats
British children's books
David Fickling Books books